The 1897 Montana football team represented the University of Montana in the 1897 college football season. They were led by first-year head coach Fred D. Smith.

Schedule

References

Montana
Montana Grizzlies football seasons
Montana football